Roenneberg may refer to:

 Roenneberg hundred at the List of hundreds of Sweden
 Till Roenneberg - German circadian rhythm scientist